Keith George Finch (born 6 May 1982) is an English footballer who played as a goalkeeper. He played in the Football League for Darlington and in non-league football in the north-east of England for a variety of clubs, which included eight years with Northern League club Shildon.

Life and career
Finch was born in Easington Lane, County Durham. He began his football career under the YTS trainee with Darlington. He made an unexpected debut for the club at the age of 17, in the first round FA Cup-tie against Southport in October 1999, as a half-time replacement for injured goalkeeper Andy Collett. The Sunday Mirror reported that Finch produced "three super saves" to help preserve Darlington's one-goal lead. He had to wait more than two years for his first appearance in the Football League, again as substitute for Collett, this time making "a string of fine saves" as Darlington beat Lincoln City 2–1 in the Third Division. He had a run of games in the first team while Collett was returning to fitness, but when Collett suffered a collapsed lung at the beginning of March, Finch was left as the only fit goalkeeper at the club. The last of Finch's 12 league appearances was in a defeat to York City on 16 March. Later that month, Darlington signed Chris Porter on a pay-as-you-play basis, though with owner George Reynolds unwilling to pay, a fans' website raised money to cover Porter's wages. Finch was one of several players to be released when their contracts expired at the end of the season.

He signed for Northern Premier League club Bishop Auckland, but his time there was interrupted by injury and he was released in early November. Finch then moved into the Northern League with Seaham Red Star, returning to the Northern Premier with Gateshead in October 2004. After five months and 23 appearances, 16 in the league, he left. He spent time with Northern League Sunderland Nissan, before returning to Seaham for two seasons, in the first of which he was player of the year as the club were promoted as runners-up to the Northern League Premier Division. His next port of call was Spennymoor Town: no sooner had he saved a penalty and scored his own in the shootout that took his team through to the last 16 of the 2008–09 FA Vase, than he was transfer-listed and sold to Shildon after Spennymoor received an unexpected bill. He helped the club reach the semi-final of the 2012–13 FA Vase, in which they lost to Tunbridge Wells, and continued as goalkeeping coach and increasingly occasional player until manager Gary Forrest and his staff left the club in January 2017. Finch followed Forrest to West Auckland Town at the end of the season, but moved on to Sunderland RCA early in 2017–18, and spent the 2018–19 season with Easington Colliery.

In 2008, 2010 and 2012, Finch was in goal as Hetton Lyons won the FA Sunday Cup. He has also been involved with youth football club Hetton Juniors as coach and chairman.

References

1982 births
Living people
Sportspeople from Easington, County Durham
Footballers from County Durham
English footballers
Association football goalkeepers
Darlington F.C. players
Bishop Auckland F.C. players
Seaham Red Star F.C. players
Gateshead F.C. players
Sunderland Nissan F.C. players
Spennymoor Town F.C. players
Shildon A.F.C. players
West Auckland Town F.C. players
Sunderland Ryhope Community Association F.C. players
Easington Colliery A.F.C. players
English Football League players
Northern Premier League players
Northern Football League players